Jitendra Singh (born 12 June 1971) is the former Minister of State for Youth Affairs and Sports (Independent charge) and the Minister of State for Defence, Government of India. He assumed this charge on 28 October 2012. Formerly, Jitendra Singh was the Minister of State for Home Affairs, Government of India; a position that he assumed in July 2011. He was the Member of Parliament representing the Alwar constituency of Rajasthan. Jitendra Singh is a member of the Indian National Congress. He belongs to the royal family of  Alwar.

Personal life 

Jitendra Singh was born into the Royal family of Alwar to Yuvraj Sri Pratap Singh and Mahendra Kumari. Jitendra's grandfather was His Highness Colonel Sir Tej Singh Prabhakar Bahadur,
K.C.S.I. (1911-2009), the reigning Maharaja of Alwar.

The Alwar royal family belongs to the Naruka clan of Kachhwaha dynasty.

Jitendra Singh is married to Ambika Singh. They have one son and two daughters.

Education 

Jitendra Singh did his schooling at Wynberg Allen School at Mussorie, followed by Bachelors in Commerce from the University of Delhi. Subsequently, he trained in Automobile engineering from Germany.

Political career 

 Elected as a member of Rajasthan Legislative Assembly representing Alwar City constituency (state parliament of Rajasthan) in 1998.
 Elected for second term as a member of Rajasthan Legislative Assembly representing Alwar City constituency (state parliament of Rajasthan) in 2004.
 Appointed as Secretary, All India Congress Committee in 2007 (assists Rahul Gandhi in his political projects).
 Elected as Member of Parliament to the 15th Lok Sabha (2009-2014) representing the Alwar constituency of Rajasthan in 2009.
 Appointed as Minister of State for Home Affairs, Government of India in July 2011 
 Appointed as Minister of State for Youth Affairs and Sports (Independent charge) and Minister of State for Defence, Government of India in the latest Cabinet reshuffle in Oct 2012.
 Appointed as All India Congress Committee In-charge of Odisha in March 2018 
 Appointed as CWC Member and General Secretary AICC in September 2020

References 

 

1971 births
Living people
Indian National Congress politicians
Rajasthani politicians
Rajasthani people
India MPs 2009–2014
People from Alwar
State cabinet ministers of Rajasthan
Lok Sabha members from Rajasthan
Union ministers of state of India with independent charge